Oreobates lundbergi is a species of frogs in the family Strabomantidae. It is endemic to central Peru and is known from the Amazonian slopes of the Cordillera Oriental in the Paucartambo District, Pasco.

Description
The type series consists of three adult females, a male, and a juvenile. The male measures  and the females  in snout–vent length. The snout is long and rounded. The tympanum has prominent annulus. Skin is smooth with low, scattered tubercles on the dorsum. The fingers and toes have small discs and weak lateral fringes but no webbing. The dorsal coloration is tan with diffuse, dark brown blotches and a narrow, dark brown, interrupted mid-dorsal stripe. The throat, chest, belly and extremities are flesh to gray in color.

Habitat and conservation
Specimens have been found on the
ground with open vegetation. One specimen escaped to a small hole by which it was sitting. Threats to this species are unknown.

References

lundbergi
Endemic fauna of Peru
Amphibians of Peru
Amphibians of the Andes
Frogs of South America
Amphibians described in 2005
Taxonomy articles created by Polbot